Fiscal pedaling (a calque from , or simply ) is a governmental creative accounting technique involving the use of state-owned banks to front funds required for paying general government obligations without officially declaring a loan, thus hiding these transfers from public scrutiny and delaying repayment from the Treasury to these banks.  As such it is a kind of "overdraft" implying a positive balance sheet that does not really exist.  Sometimes the term fiscal backpedaling is used.

The term gained popularity with the Brazilian Presidential election of 2014, in which President Rousseff was reelected. This led to the impeachment of Dilma Rousseff beginning in 2015 on multiple charges including fiscal pedaling, and her subsequent removal from office a year later..

One possible motivation for fiscal pedaling is political advantage, in that it permits a government to conceal the true extent of its fiscal obligations during a political campaign. President Rousseff's government was accused of using these accounting techniques during the bitterly fought campaign of 2014, with the funding thus obtained allegedly used to support programs for the poor, credits to farmers, and subsidies for low-income housing. Supporters claimed this was standard practice in Brazil and had been engaged in by previous Presidents, and that the opposition to her was purely political.

See also 

 2015–16 protests in Brazil

References

External links 
 
 
  
  

Accounting
Corruption in Brazil